Alan Goldberg may refer to:
Alan Goldberg (architect), American architect
Alan Goldberg (judge) (1940–2016), Federal Court of Australia judge
Alan E. Goldberg (born 1949), American Thoroughbred horse racing trainer